URA Radio is a public radio station in Bolgatanga, the capital town of the Upper East Region of Ghana. The station is owned and run by the state broadcaster – the Ghana Broadcasting Corporation.

References

Radio stations in Ghana
Mass media in Bolgatanga